Maksim Razumaw (born 4 March 1977) is a Belarusian former professional footballer. After retiring, he worked as a youth football coach.

Honours
Lokomotiv-96 Vitebsk
 Belarusian Cup winner: 1997–98

Gomel
 Belarusian Premier League champion: 2003
 Belarusian Cup winner: 2001–02

Naftan Novopolotsk
 Belarusian Cup winner: 2008–09

References

External links

1977 births
Living people
Belarusian footballers
Belarus international footballers
Belarusian expatriate footballers
Expatriate footballers in Lithuania
FC Vitebsk players
FC Gomel players
FC Naftan Novopolotsk players
FC DSK Gomel players
FC Smorgon players
FC Lokomotiv Gomel players
FC Orsha players
FK Kareda Kaunas players
Association football midfielders
Sportspeople from Vitebsk